Josef Mikunda (born 27 August 1953) is a Czech volleyball player. He competed in the men's tournament at the 1976 Summer Olympics.

References

External links
 

1953 births
Living people
Czech men's volleyball players
Olympic volleyball players of Czechoslovakia
Volleyball players at the 1976 Summer Olympics
People from Vsetín District
Sportspeople from the Zlín Region